Smith McPherson (February 14, 1848 – January 17, 1915) was a United States representative from Iowa and a United States district judge of the United States District Court for the Southern District of Iowa.

Education and career

Born on February 14, 1848, near Mooresville, Morgan County, Indiana, McPherson attended the common schools and Mooresville Academy. He received a Bachelor of Laws in 1870 from the University of Iowa College of Law. He was admitted to the bar and entered private practice in Red Oak, Iowa from 1870 to 1874. He was district attorney for the Third Judicial District of Iowa from 1874 to 1880. He was Attorney General of Iowa from 1881 to 1885. He resumed private practice in Red Oak from 1885 to 1899.

Congressional service

In August 1898, McPherson defeated incumbent congressman Alva L. Hager and two others in the race for the Republican nomination in Iowa's 9th congressional district. For several days, no candidate received the required number of votes, but McPherson prevailed on the 618th ballot, after Hager threw his support to him. McPherson was then elected to the United States House of Representatives of the 56th United States Congress and served from March 4, 1899, until his resignation on June 6, 1900, to accept a federal judicial post.

Federal judicial service

McPherson was nominated by President William McKinley on April 3, 1900, to a seat on the United States District Court for the Southern District of Iowa vacated by Judge John Simson Woolson. He was confirmed by the United States Senate on May 7, 1900, and received his commission the same day. His service terminated on January 17, 1915, due to his death in Red Oak. He was interred in Evergreen Cemetery in Red Oak.

Notable case

In McPherson's final year on the bench, he upheld the constitutionality of Iowa's workers' compensation statute against an attack by an employer alleging that it violated due process.

References

Sources
 

 

1848 births
1915 deaths
Iowa Attorneys General
Judges of the United States District Court for the Southern District of Iowa
United States federal judges appointed by William McKinley
University of Iowa College of Law alumni
Iowa state court judges
Republican Party members of the United States House of Representatives from Iowa
People from Mooresville, Indiana
19th-century American politicians